Benedikt Roezl (13 August 1824, Horoměřice – 14 October 1885, Prague) was a traveller, gardener and botanist (sometimes Benedict or Benito Roezl as called by the Indians). Probably the most famous collector of orchids of his time.

Despite the loss of a hand (in an accident in Cuba), Roezl travelled the world and discovered more than 800 species of orchid, with more than forty named in his honour.

Roezl was also the founder of the Czech botanical magazine, Flora, in 1880. There is a statue (depicting him holding an orchid with a Native American kneeling beside him) of Roezl in Prague, located on the southern end of Charles Square.

Some of the Roezl's Travels 

3 August 1872: New York 
Benedikt Roezl travelled with his nephew and collector František Klaboch to New York. Klaboch later died of yellow fever. Through St. Louis they left to Denver.

6 September 1872: Denver 
Roezl collected Yucca angustifolia (6 boxes) and Calochortus (1000). He was robbed here and left to New Mexico. Left again to California.

31 October 1872: San Francisco
From San Francisco he left to Acapulco and to the surrounding Sierra Madre where he collected over 2000 orchids. When looking for the Oncidium tigrinum orchid, he climbed to 3000 metres above sea level. From Mexico he left for Caracas.

10 February 1873: Caracas, Venezuela
Roezl was looking for an unknown orchid called "flor de mayo". Collected 8 boxes and left for Mexico via Havana.

March 1873: Sontecomapan, Mexico
Stopped by to pick up his nephew Eduard Klaboch. Then left for Havana and to New York again. From New York travelled to Peru.

August 1873: Peru
He climbed the 5000-metre-high mountains to bring back more than 10.000 orchids to Lima. Roezl then   travelled to southern Peru.

Bolivia, Ecuador
He visited lake Titicaca, La Paz and through the Illimani mountain walked the Yungas territory, bringing back many orchids. Once again climbed the Andes, visited Ecuador, Chimborazo mountain and at the 6000 metres above sea level he discovered the new Pescatorea roezlii orchid.

April 1874: London

1875: Prague

Plants named in Roezl's Honour 
Among the orchids named in his honour are:

Miltoniopsis roezlii
Pescatorea roezlii
Selenipedium roezlii
Sobralia roezlii
 genus Roezliella

Other plants named in his honour: 
Zamia roezlii - a cycad of the family Zamiaceae
Ribes roezlii - Sierra gooseberry

 List of plants described by Roezl can be found here.

Literature 
 Benedikt Roezl: Catalogue des graines de conifères mexicains. 1857.
 Benedikt Roezl: My last trip to the western coast of Mexico, 188? translated into Czech, magazine Flora as "Poslední má cesta na západní pobřeží mexické"
 Benedikt Roezl: Plants I have discovered in North and South America, 188? translated into Czech, magazine Flora as "Rostliny mnou v severní a jižní Americe objevené"

References

Books and external links 
 Benedikt Roezl on Orchids.co.in
 Benedikt Roezl on Czech radio in Spanish
 Roezl on PACSOA Palm and Cycad Societies of Australia
 Information from the home region of Roezl  in Czech
 Lev V.: Benedikt Roezl, Orbis, Praha, 1949 - the main biography on Roezl in Czech
 The Garden Journal of the Royal Horticultural Society, Vol. 122, Feb. 1997
 Healey B.J.: The Plant Hunters, Charles Scribner%27s Sons, 1975
 Lemmon K.: The Golden Age of Plant Hunters, Phoenix House,1968
 Coats A. M.:The Plant Hunters, McGraw-Hill, 1970
 Toufar P.: Tajemnou českou krajinou, Regia, Praha, 2001
 Garden, The . 1885. Obituary .Vo. 28, no. 727.
 Gardeners' Chronicle. 1885. Benedict Roezl. Vol. 24. no. 617.
 Gardeners' Chronicle . 1892. Benedict Roezl.Vol. 11,no. 263.
 Gardening World, The. 1885. October 24.
 Kline, Mary C. 1963. Benedict Roezl- Famous orchid collectors .Amer.Orch. Soc. Bull. 32,no. 8.
 Sander,F. 1952. Benedict Roezl and Cattleya aurea . The Orch.Rev. 60, no. 710.
 Luigi Berliocchi,Mark Griffiths: The Orchid in Lore and Legend - available on Google Books

19th-century Czech botanists
Orchidologists
1823 births
1885 deaths
Botanists active in South America
Czech explorers
People from Prague-West District